The Third Doctor comic stories is a range of offscreen adventures featuring the third incarnation of the Doctor, the protagonist of the hit sc-fi series, Doctor Who.

History
During the early 1970s, the adventures of the Third Doctor in comic mainly ran in two similar formats, TV Comic and Countdown, and as with every incarnation of the Doctor, the Third Doctor featured in Doctor Who Annuals.

Due to the Third Doctor's exile on Earth for most of his tenure, these comics are notable for including UNIT in a large number of stories, in particular, UNIT's founder and the Doctor's sidekick, The Brigadier, with adventures featuring just them as principal characters being set between Inferno and Terror of the Autons.

Following The Three Doctors, which saw the Doctor's exile lifted, the comics were allowed to expand, taking the Doctor on new adventures across time and space.

Polystyle comic strips

TV Comic

Countdown

Sub-Zero (featuring the Daleks)

TV Comics Holiday Specials

Doctor Who Annuals

Doctor Who Magazine comic strips

Doctor Who Magazine

Titan Comics

See also
 List of Doctor Who comic stories
 First Doctor comic stories
 Second Doctor comic stories
 Fourth Doctor comic stories
 Fifth Doctor comic stories
 Sixth Doctor comic stories
 Seventh Doctor comic stories
 Eighth Doctor comic stories
 War Doctor comic stories
 Ninth Doctor comic stories
 Tenth Doctor comic stories
 Eleventh Doctor comic stories
 Twelfth Doctor comic stories

Comics based on Doctor Who
Third Doctor stories